Live at Montreux 2013 is a live video of a concert performed by ZZ Top on July 10, 2013 at the Montreux Jazz Festival, Switzerland, released in July 2014 on DVD and Blu-ray by Eagle Vision.

Overview
The set list blends tracks from early seventies albums such as Tres Hombres and Fandango through their eighties period with Eliminator and Afterburner, and up to their most recent release and return to their blues roots with La Futura. The middle section of the concert features a jazz-blues tribute to the late Montreux Jazz Festival founder Claude Nobs, with guest appearances by Mike Flanigin on Hammond Organ and Van Wilks on guitar.

Track listing

"Got Me Under Pressure"
"Waitin' for the Bus"
"Jesus Just Left Chicago"
"Gimmie All Your Lovin'"
"Pincushion"
"I Gotsta Get Paid"
"Flyin' High"
"Kiko"
"I Loved A Woman" (Freddie King cover) 
"Foxey Lady" (The Jimi Hendrix Experience cover) 
"My Head's In Mississippi"
"Chartreuse"
"Sharp Dressed Man"
"Legs"
"Tube Snake Boogie"
"La Grange" (with Sloppy Drunk Jam) 
"Tush"

Bonus Material:
Interview with Billy Gibbons and Dusty Hill
Billy Gibbons on the Montreux Jazz Festival

References

ZZ Top video albums
2015 video albums
2015 live albums
Live video albums
Eagle Rock Entertainment live albums
Eagle Rock Entertainment video albums